"Chav", also "charver", "scally" and "roadman" in parts of England, is a British term, usually used in a pejorative way. The term is used to describe an anti-social lower-class youth dressed in sportswear. "Chavette" is a related term referring to female chavs, and the adjectives "chavvy", "chavvish", and "chavtastic"  are used to describe things associated with chavs, such as fashion, slang, etc. In other countries like Ireland, "Skanger" is used in a similar manner. In Canada, in the province of British Columbia they're known as "Surrey jacks". In Ontario (particularly in Toronto), the term is "hoodman", an equivalent of the term "roadman" used in England. In Newfoundland, "skeet" is used in a similar way, while in Australia, "eshay" or "adlay" is used.

Etymology
Opinion is divided on the origin of the term. "Chav" may have its origins in the Romani word "chavi", meaning "child". The word "chavvy" has existed since at least the 19th century; lexicographer Eric Partridge mentions it in his 1950 dictionary of slang and unconventional English, giving its date of origin as c. 1860.

The word in its current pejorative usage is recorded by the Oxford English Dictionary as first used in a Usenet forum in 1998 and first used in a newspaper in 2002. By 2005 the term had become widespread in its use as to refer to a type of anti-social, uncultured youth, who wear excessive flashy jewellery, white athletic shoes, baseball caps, and sham designer clothes. The girls commonly wear clothing which exposes their midriff.

In his 2011 book, Chavs: The Demonization of the Working Class, Owen Jones argued that the word is an attack on the poor. In the 2010 book Stab Proof Scarecrows by Lance Manley, it was surmised that "chav" was an abbreviation for "council housed and violent". This is widely regarded as a backronym. This interpretation of the word was used in a 2012 public statement by rapper Plan B as he spoke out to oppose the use of the term.

In 2013 linguist David Crystal said on BBC Learning English:
People talk about "chav behaviour" or "chav insults" and that sort of thing. Oh, don't believe the popular etymologies that you read sometimes in the press and on websites. I saw one the other day, people said, "It's an acronym, 'chav', from 'council house and violent'"—well, no, it isn't, that was made up in recent times.

It has also been suggested that the term is derived from the name of the town of Chatham, in Kent, but the Oxford English Dictionary thinks this is "probably a later rationalization".

Stereotype

Besides referring to loutish (ill-mannered) behaviour, violence, and particular speech patterns (all of which are stereotypes), the chav stereotype includes wearing branded designer sportswear, which may be accompanied by some form of flashy gold jewellery otherwise termed as "bling". They have been described as adopting "black culture".

In a case where a teenage woman was barred from her own home under the terms of an anti-social behaviour order in 2005, some British national newspapers branded her "the real-life Vicky Pollard" with the Daily Star running headlines reading, "Good riddance to chav scum: real life Vicky Pollard evicted", both referring to a BBC comedy character (see In the media below). A 2006 survey by YouGov suggested 70% of TV industry professionals believed that Vicky Pollard was an accurate reflection of white working-class youth.

Response to the stereotype has ranged from amusement to criticism, with some saying that it is a new manifestation of classism. The Guardian in 2011 identified issues stemming from the use of the terms "hoodies" and "chav" within the mass media, which had led to age discrimination as a result of mass media-created stereotypes.

Commercial effect
In 2005 the fashion house Burberry, whilst deriding chavs, claimed that the widespread fashion in the UK of chavs wearing its branded style (Burberry check) was due to the widespread availability of cheaper counterfeit versions.

The large supermarket chain Asda has attempted to trademark the word "chav" for a line of confectionery. A spokeswoman said, "With slogans from characters in shows such as Little Britain and The Catherine Tate Show providing us with more and more contemporary slang, our "Whatever" sweets – now nicknamed chav hearts – have become very popular with kids and grown-ups alike. We thought we needed to give them some respect and have decided to trademark our sweets."

Criticism of the stereotype
A BBC TV documentary suggested that chav culture is an evolution of previous working-class youth subcultures associated with particular commercial clothing styles, such as mods, skinheads, and casuals.

In a February 2005 article in The Times, Julie Burchill argued that use of the word is a form of "social racism", and that such "sneering" reveals more about the shortcomings of the "chav-haters" than those of their supposed victims. The writer John Harris argued along similar lines in a 2007 article in The Guardian. The widespread use of the "chav" stereotype has been criticised. Some argue that it amounts to simple snobbery and elitism. Critics of the term have argued that its users are "neo-snobs", and that its increasing popularity raises questions about how British society deals with social mobility and class.

The Fabian Society considers the term to be offensive and regards it as "sneering and patronising" to a largely voiceless group. On describing those who use the word, the society stated that "we all know their old serviette/napkin, lounge/living room, settee/sofa tricks. But this is something new. This is middle class hatred of the white working class, pure and simple. The Fabian Society have been highly critical of the BBC in using the term in broadcasts. Use of the term 'chav' was reported in The Guardian in 2011 as "class abuse by people asserting superiority". Writer Owen Jones also criticised the use of the term in his book Chavs: The Demonization of the Working Class.

In the media
By 2004, the word was used in national newspapers and common parlance in the UK. Susie Dent's Larpers and Shroomers: The Language Report, published by the Oxford University Press, designated it as the "word of the year" in 2004.

Characters described as "chavs" have been featured in numerous British television programmes, as well as films. The character, clothing, attitude and musical interests of Lauren Cooper and her friends in the BBC comedy series, The Catherine Tate Show, have been associated with the chav stereotype. The BBC comedy series Little Britain features the character Vicky Pollard (portrayed by Matt Lucas), a parody of a teenage female chav. In the British television series Misfits, the character of Kelly Bailey is presented as a stereotypical chav. Lauren Socha, the actress who portrays Kelly, has described the character as being "a bit chavvy". The Times has referred to the character as "[a] chavvish girl", and the character has been said to possess a "chav accent".

In the "New Earth" episode of the BBC TV series Doctor Who, the character Lady Cassandra is transplanted into Rose Tyler's body (Billie Piper). When Cassandra sees herself in a mirror, she exclaims "Oh my God... I'm a chav!" In Kingsman: The Secret Service, the main character Eggsy Unwin (Taron Egerton) is introduced as a stereotypical chav.

See also

 Ah Beng
 Bogan
 Bootboy
 Dizelaši
 Eshays
 Football casuals, 1980s precursor to the chav subculture
 Gopnik
 Hooliganism
 Lad culture
 Ned (Scottish)
 Redneck
 Ratchet (slang)
 Skeet, a similar term used on the Canadian island of Newfoundland
 Social structure
 Social structure of the United Kingdom
 Subculture
 Underclass
 Westie, similar stereotype in Australia and New Zealand
 Wigger
 Yob

References
Notes

Further reading

External links

Audio
 Professor David Crystal, BBC World Service, Learning English, Mp3.

Video
 Plan B. Youth, music and London at TEDxObserver.

2000s slang
2010s fashion
Anti-social behaviour
British slang
Fashion aesthetics
Class-related slurs
Social class subcultures
Stereotypes of the working class
Youth culture in the United Kingdom
Social class in the United Kingdom
2010s slang
Socioeconomic stereotypes